The men's 10 metre air rifle competition at the 2006 Asian Games in Doha, Qatar was held on 2 December at the Lusail Shooting Range.

Schedule
All times are Arabia Standard Time (UTC+03:00)

Records

Results
Legend
DNS — Did not start

Qualification

Final

References 

ISSF Results Overview
Results

External links
Official website

Men Rifle 10